The 1960 Football Cup of Ukrainian SSR among KFK  was the annual season of Ukraine's football knockout competition for amateur football teams.

Competition schedule

Preliminary round

|}
Replay

|}
Notes:

First qualification round

|}
Replay

|}
Notes:
 The match Avanhard – Garrison was awarded 3–0 as a technical result.

Second qualification round

|}
Replay

|}
Notes:

Quarterfinals (1/4)

|}

Semifinals (1/2)

|}

Final
September 3

|}
Replay

|}

External links
 (1960 - 22 чемпионат СССР Кубок Украинской ССР среди КФК) at footbook.ru
 1960. regional-football.ru

Ukrainian Amateur Cup
Ukrainian Amateur Cup
Amateur Cup